The number , also known as Euler's number, is a mathematical constant approximately equal to 2.71828 that can be characterized in many ways. It is the base of the natural logarithms. It can also be calculated as the sum of the infinite series

The natural logarithm, or logarithm to base , is the inverse function to the natural exponential function. There are various other characterizations.

The number  is sometimes called Euler's number (not to be confused with Euler's constant )after the Swiss mathematician Leonhard Euleror Napier's constantafter John Napier. The constant was discovered by the Swiss mathematician Jacob Bernoulli while studying compound interest.

All five appear in one formulation of Euler's identity  and play important and recurring roles across mathematics. Like the constant ,  is irrational (it cannot be represented as a ratio of integers) and transcendental (it is not a root of any non-zero polynomial with rational coefficients).

History 
The first references to the constant were published in 1618 in the table of an appendix of a work on logarithms by John Napier. However, this did not contain the constant itself, but simply a list of logarithms to the base . It is assumed that the table was written by William Oughtred.

The constant itself was introduced by Jacob Bernoulli in 1683, for solving the problem of continuous compounding of interest. 
In his solution, the constant  occurs as the limit 

where  represents the fraction of the year on which the compound interest is evaluated (for example,  for a month).

The first known use of the constant, represented by the letter , was in correspondence from Gottfried Leibniz to Christiaan Huygens in 1690 and 1691. 

Leonhard Euler started to use the letter  for the constant in 1727 or 1728, in an unpublished paper on explosive forces in cannons, and in a letter to Christian Goldbach on 25 November 1731. It is unknown why Euler chose the letter . Although some researchers used the letter  in the subsequent years, the letter  was more common and eventually became standard.

Applications

Compound interest 

Jacob Bernoulli discovered this constant in 1683, while studying a question about compound interest:

If the interest is credited twice in the year, the interest rate for each 6 months will be 50%, so the initial $1 is multiplied by 1.5 twice, yielding  at the end of the year. Compounding quarterly yields , and compounding monthly yields . If there are  compounding intervals, the interest for each interval will be  and the value at the end of the year will be $1.00 × .

Bernoulli noticed that this sequence approaches a limit (the force of interest) with larger  and, thus, smaller compounding intervals. Compounding weekly yields $2.692596..., while compounding daily yields $2.714567... (approximately two cents more). That is, with continuous compounding, the account value will reach $2.718281828...

More generally, an account that starts at $1 and offers an annual interest rate of  will, after  years, yield  dollars with continuous compounding.

(Note here that  is the decimal equivalent of the rate of interest expressed as a percentage, so for 5% interest, .)

Bernoulli trials 

The number  itself also has applications in probability theory, in a way that is not obviously related to exponential growth. As  increases, the probability that gambler will lose all  bets approaches . For , this is already approximately 1/2.789509....

This is an example of a Bernoulli trial process. Each time the gambler plays the slots, there is a one in n chance of winning. Playing n times is modeled by the binomial distribution, which is closely related to the binomial theorem and Pascal's triangle. The probability of winning  times out of n trials is:

In particular, the probability of winning zero times is

The limit of the above expression, as n tends to infinity, is precisely .

Standard normal distribution 

The normal distribution with zero mean and unit standard deviation is known as the standard normal distribution, given by the probability density function

Derangements 

But the butler has not asked the identities of the guests, and so he puts the hats into boxes selected at random. The problem of de Montmort is to find the probability that none of the hats gets put into the right box.

As the number  of guests tends to infinity,  approaches . Furthermore, the number of ways the hats can be placed into the boxes so that none of the hats are in the right box is  rounded to the nearest integer, for every positive .

Optimal planning problems 

This is useful in the problem of a stick of length  that is broken into  equal parts.  The value of  that maximizes the product of the lengths is then either
 or 

The quantity  is also a measure of information gleaned from an event occurring with probability , so that essentially the same optimal division appears in optimal planning problems like the secretary problem.

Asymptotics 
The number  occurs naturally in connection with many problems involving asymptotics. An example is Stirling's formula for the asymptotics of the factorial function, in which both the numbers  and  appear:

As a consequence,

In calculus 

The principal motivation for introducing the number , particularly in calculus, is to perform differential and integral calculus with exponential functions and logarithms. A general exponential  has a derivative, given by a limit:

Consequently, the exponential function with base  is particularly suited to doing calculus.  (as opposed to some other number as the base of the exponential function) makes calculations involving the derivatives much simpler.

Another motivation comes from considering the derivative of the base- logarithm (i.e.), for :

where the substitution  was made. So symbolically,

Thus, there are two ways of selecting such special numbers . In each case, one arrives at a convenient choice of base for doing calculus.

Alternative characterizations 

So far, the following two (equivalent) properties have been introduced:

 The number  is the unique positive real number such that .
 The number  is the unique positive real number such that .

The following four characterizations can be proved to be equivalent:

Properties

Calculus 
As in the motivation, the exponential function  is important in part because it is the unique function (up to multiplication by a constant ) that is equal to its own derivative:

and therefore its own antiderivative as well:

  

Equivalently, the family of functions

where  is any real or complex number, is the solution to the differential equation

Inequalities 

The number  is the unique real number such that

for all positive .

Also, we have the inequality

for all real , with equality if and only if .  Furthermore,  is the unique base of the exponential for which the inequality  holds for all .  This is a limiting case of Bernoulli's inequality.

Exponential-like functions 

Steiner's problem asks to find the global maximum for the function

Similarly,  is where the global minimum occurs for the function

The infinite tetration

 or 

converges if and only if , shown by a theorem of Leonhard Euler.

Number theory 
The real number  is irrational. Euler proved this by showing that its simple continued fraction expansion is infinite. (See also Fourier's proof that  is irrational.)

Furthermore, by the Lindemann–Weierstrass theorem,  is transcendental, meaning that it is not a solution of any non-zero polynomial equation with rational coefficients. It was the first number to be proved transcendental without having been specifically constructed for this purpose (compare with Liouville number); the proof was given by Charles Hermite in 1873.

It is conjectured that  is normal, meaning that when  is expressed in any base the possible digits in that base are uniformly distributed (occur with equal probability in any sequence of given length).

It is conjectured that  is not a Kontsevich-Zagier period.

Complex numbers 
The exponential function  may be written as a Taylor series

which holds for every complex .

from which it follows that, in the principal branch of the logarithm,

Furthermore, using the laws for exponentiation,

which is de Moivre's formula.

The expression

Representations 

The number  can be represented in a variety of ways: as an infinite series, an infinite product, a continued fraction, or a limit of a sequence. Two of these representations, often used in introductory calculus courses, are the limit

given above, and the series

Less common is the continued fraction

which written out looks like

This continued fraction for  converges three times as quickly:

Many other series, sequence, continued fraction, and infinite product representations of  have been proved.

Stochastic representations 
One such approach begins with an infinite sequence of independent random variables , ..., drawn from the uniform distribution on [0, 1]. Let  be the least number  such that the sum of the first  observations exceeds 1:

Known digits 
The number of known digits of  has increased substantially during the last decades. This is due both to the increased performance of computers and to algorithmic improvements.

Since around 2010, the proliferation of modern high-speed desktop computers has made it feasible for most amateurs to compute trillions of digits of  within acceptable amounts of time. On Dec 5, 2020, a record-setting calculation was made, giving  to 31,415,926,535,897 (approximately ) digits.

Computing the digits 

This method uses binary splitting to compute  with fewer single-digit arithmetic operations and reduced bit complexity. Combining this with Fast Fourier Transform-based methods of multiplying integers makes computing the digits very fast.

In computer culture 

During the emergence of internet culture, individuals and organizations sometimes paid homage to the number .

In an early example, the computer scientist Donald Knuth let the version numbers of his program Metafont approach . The versions are 2, 2.7, 2.71, 2.718, and so forth.

In another instance, the IPO filing for Google in 2004, rather than a typical round-number amount of money, the company announced its intention to raise 2,718,281,828 USD, which is  billion dollars rounded to the nearest dollar.

Google was also responsible for a billboard
that appeared in the heart of Silicon Valley, and later in Cambridge, Massachusetts; Seattle, Washington; and Austin, Texas. It read "{first 10-digit prime found in consecutive digits of }.com". Solving this problem and visiting the advertised (now defunct) website led to an even more difficult problem to solve, which consisted in finding the fifth term in the sequence 7182818284, 8182845904, 8747135266, 7427466391. It turned out that the sequence consisted of 10-digit numbers found in consecutive digits of  whose digits summed to 49. The fifth term in the sequence is 5966290435, which starts at the 127th digit.
Solving this second problem finally led to a Google Labs webpage where the visitor was invited to submit a résumé.

References

Further reading 
 Maor, Eli; : The Story of a Number, 
 Commentary on Endnote 10 of the book Prime Obsession for another stochastic representation

External links 

 The number  to 1 million places and NASA.gov 2 and 5 million places
  Approximations – Wolfram MathWorld
 Earliest Uses of Symbols for Constants Jan. 13, 2008
 "The story of ", by Robin Wilson at Gresham College, 28 February 2007 (available for audio and video download)

 
Mathematical constants
Real transcendental numbers
Leonhard Euler